Christopher Williams (August 22, 1967) is an American singer and actor. Williams, who emerged during the late 1980s as a recording artist for Geffen Records, has scored many R&B hit singles, notably "Talk to Myself" (1989), "I'm Dreamin'" (1991) and "Every Little Thing U Do" (1993).

Career

Music 
The single "I'm Dreamin'", from the New Jack City soundtrack, became a No. 1 single on Billboard's Hot R&B/Hip-Hop Singles & Tracks charts. After a six-year hiatus from recording music, he returned to the scene with Real Men Do on the indie label Renegade, in 2001. It received a glowing, flattering review in Ebony Magazine that summer. In between solo pursuits, he has been a contributor to Alex Bugnon's "As Promised", with a smooth-jazz version of Mary J. Blige's "All That I Can Say", featured on "In Your World" with Twista & The Speedknot Mobstas, a very up-tempo track on the soundtrack of "Doctor Dolittle", and on the Cafe Soul All-Stars CD with a single titled "Used to Be". Other soundtrack contributions include: "Tha 2 of Us" from the film Bulletproof, "Superhero" from the film Butter, "Boom and the Bang" (featuring R&B songstress Monifah) and "I'm Yours" from the soundtrack of the stage play Men Cry in the Dark, and "Stranger in My Life" from the film Gunmen. Additional collaborations throughout his career include: "Round and Round" and "No Sunshine" from the CD Phuture Flava, "Love You More Than Words Can Say" from the CD Soul Blitz Allstars, "I Hope That We Can Be Together Soon" (a duet with Miki Howard), "You Are So Fine" (a duet with Shae), "Can't Wait to Be with You" from the DJ Jazzy Jeff & The Fresh Prince release Code Red, "I Wanna B Ure Lover" from the F.S. Effect release So Deep It's Bottomless, and "Sexual Healing" (a duet with reggae dancehall queen Patra). At the end of 1994, Williams was also part of the group Black Men United for the hit single "U Will Know" for the film Jason's Lyric and its movie's soundtrack album, along with El DeBarge, Al B. Sure!, Gerald Levert and others.

Acting 
Williams appeared in the 1991 film New Jack City in the role of Kareem Akbar, one of Nino Brown's assistants. He also had a cameo appearance in the 1990s police drama New York Undercover as "the singer", performing "Stranger in My Life", in the episode titled "The Shooter". He had another cameo in Gunmen, starring Christopher Lambert and Mario Van Peebles, singing a song titled "Stranger in My Life". Williams has also starred or co-starred in several successful off-Broadway theatre productions during the 2000s, including A Good Man Is Hard to Find, A House Is Not a Home, Men Cry in the Dark, The Love You Save, and The Man He Used to Be. Recently, Williams played a main character in the stage play The Clean-up Woman, written by JD Lawrence, alongside actresses Telma Hopkins and Jackée. Williams also appeared in the stage plays Guilty Until Proven Innocent starring K-Ci & JoJo, and The Man of Her Dreams starring Shirley Murdock and Dave Hollister of Blackstreet fame. Williams also played the role of "Ned" in the Reuben Rox 2002 B movie comedy/horror/thriller film Revenge of the Unhappy Campers (bootleg alternate title Night of the Unhappy Campers). This particular work has not been released to DVD for sale, though it can be rented in some larger markets.

Personal life 
Williams was born August 22, 1967, in Bronx, New York. Williams is the nephew of jazz singer Ella Fitzgerald. Known for his passionate baritone voice, Williams has been called the "Modern Teddy Pendergrass". He attended Purchase College; now known as State University of New York in Harrison, New York. He is an actor, singer, songwriter, and producer. Williams is known for roles in New Jack City (1991), Bulletproof (1996), and Gunmen (1993). After releasing three albums, all of which charted on the Billboard 200, he took a break from recording from 1995–2001. 

Over the course of Williams' career, he has enjoyed four Top 10 hits on the U.S. R & B charts: "Talk to Myself", "Promises", "I'm Dreamin", and "Every Little Thing You Do". Williams has a son, Christopher Jr, who was born in 1985, from a relationship with a stylist. Williams has another son Austin, who was born in 1990, with actress Stacey Dash. He also has a daughter, Cierra Barnes–Williams, born in 1993 from a relationship with Heather Barnes.

From 1991 until mid–1992, Williams dated actress Halle Berry. After Halle Berry told interviewers that an abusive ex-boyfriend struck her so hard that she lost most of the hearing in her right ear, many people assumed that Williams was the unnamed ex-boyfriend. Williams defended himself to Eurweb, the entertainment news website, denying that he ever harmed Berry, and suggesting that Berry had been referring to actor Wesley Snipes. He said, "The stuff they wrote about me and Halle was totally false. It's been said I busted her eardrum, and I'm tired of it. I never said it before but I'm so tired of people thinking I'm the guy who did it. Wesley busted her eardrum, not me."

In October 2017 Williams was arrested and charged with misdemeanor theft, accused of stealing a $99 pair of JBL headphones from a Kohl's department store in McDonough, Georgia.

Williams made public at a venue in October 2022 that he had been struggling with health issues related to kidney failure and was in a coma November 5, 2021. He openly talked about his illness causing him to lose weight drastically down to 129 pounds and admitted that it was hard to pick up a fork to feed himself. He recently made a special cameo appearance in Washington D.C. on November 12, 2022 during curtain call of the adapted stage play of New Jack City: Live on Stage and also expressed his previous update on his health when he was hospitalized weighing 137 pounds and doctors told him he may never be able to walk again. He followed his brief statements with a impromptu performance of his hit song "I'm Dreaming". The video of him discussing this can be seen on New Jack City stage play's producer Je'Caryous Johnson's Facebook video post, news outlet sources have yet to update this new information.

Discography

Studio albums

Singles

Filmography

Film

Television

References

External links 

[ Christopher Williams] at Allmusic

Year of birth missing (living people)
Living people
American male film actors
American rhythm and blues singer-songwriters
American soul singers
New jack swing musicians
Musicians from the Bronx
African-American male actors
Singers from New York City
American contemporary R&B singers
African-American male songwriters
21st-century African-American male singers
Singer-songwriters from New York (state)
20th-century African-American male singers